Henry George Bathurst, 4th Earl Bathurst (24 February 179025 May 1866), styled as Lord Apsley from 1794 to 1834, was a British peer and Tory politician.

Background and education
Born at Apsley House, he was the eldest son of Henry Bathurst, 3rd Earl Bathurst, and his wife Lady Georgina, third daughter of Lord George Lennox. He was educated at Eton College and went then to Christ Church, Oxford, graduating with a Bachelor of Arts in 1811 and a Master of Arts three years later. In 1820, he received a Doctor of Civil Law degree from the University of Oxford.

Career
Bathurst served as a clerk to the Teller of the Exchequer and in 1812, he was appointed a Commissioner of the India Board, a post he held for the next six years. He was elected to the House of Commons as one of two representatives for Weobley in January 1812, sitting until October the same year. He then represented Cirencester until 1834, when he succeeded his father in the earldom and entered the House of Lords.

On 24 January 1813 he was commissioned as Lieutenant-Colonel Commandant to raise the Royal Cotswold Local Militia at Cirencester.

He was one of the founders of the Royal Agricultural College in 1845.

Death
Bathurst died at his country residence, Oakley Park, Cirencester, on 25 May 1866 aged 76 after a long illness. His body lay in state until it was interred on the estate in front of thousands of mourners.

Family
He never married and was succeeded in the earldom by his younger brother William.

References

Bibliography
 Kidd, Charles, Williamson, David (editors). Debrett's Peerage and Baronetage New York: St Martin's Press, 1990
 Charles Mosley (ed.), Burke's Peerage and Baronetage 3 volumes, 107th edition (London 2003)
 C Kidd and D Williamson (eds), Debrett's Peerage and Baronetage (London 2000)

External links

 http://www.thepeerage.com/p2755.htm#i27542
 

1790 births
1866 deaths
Alumni of Christ Church, Oxford
4
Members of the Parliament of the United Kingdom for English constituencies
People educated at Eton College
Gloucestershire Militia officers
UK MPs 1807–1812
UK MPs 1812–1818
UK MPs 1818–1820
UK MPs 1820–1826
UK MPs 1826–1830
UK MPs 1830–1831
UK MPs 1831–1832
UK MPs 1832–1835
Bathurst, E4
Tory MPs (pre-1834)
Henry